Aulohalaelurus is a genus of catsharks in the family Scyliorhinidae.

Species
 Aulohalaelurus kanakorum Séret, 1990 (Kanakorum catshark)
 Aulohalaelurus labiosus Waite, 1905 (Australian blackspotted catshark)

References

 

 
Shark genera
Taxa named by Henry Weed Fowler